Boris Belousov may refer to:

Boris Belousov (chemist) (1893–1970), Soviet chemist and biophysicist who discovered the Belousov-Zhabotinsky reaction
Boris Belousov (politician) (born 1934), Soviet minister of defense industry